Municipal elections were held across Latvia on 1 June 2013.  All 119 municipalities and republican cities of Latvia elected their city councils.  In Riga, by far the largest city in Latvia, Harmony Centre won an absolute majority.

Results

Riga

References

2013
2013 in Latvia
2013 elections in Europe